Robaina is a surname. Notable people with the surname include:

Alejandro Robaina (1919–2010), Cuban tobacco grower
Julio Robaina, the current mayor of Hialeah, Florida
Julio Robaina (legislator), State Representative from the state of Florida
Julio Robaina (state representative), State Representative from the state of Florida
Rene Robaina (born 1965), founder, president, and CEO of Home Technology Solutions in Charlotte, NC
Roberto Robaina (born 1956), the Foreign Minister of Cuba from 1993 until 1999

See also
Vegas Robaina (cigar brand), premium cigar brand, produced in Cuba for Habanos SA, the Cuban state-owned tobacco company